Sociedad Deportiva Cultural San Antonio was a Spanish handball team based in Pamplona, Navarra. The team was based in Spain.

In July 2012, the team resigned from the Liga ASOBAL for the 2012–13 season due to the failure to find a new sponsor, being demoted two divisions (to Primera Estatal). After an uncertain few weeks, its spot in Primera Estatal was transferred to BM Ardoi, therefore, the club no longer owned any sporting team.

In April 2013, when the bankruptcy process finished, SDC San Antonio was officially liquidated.

History

Sponsors
 1968-1969: Kaiku
 1971-1972: Werner
 1972-1977: Schweppes
 1977-1978: No sponsor
 1978-1979: Reynolds
 1979-1980: Ronkari
 1980-1981: Chistu
 1981-1982: Berberana
 1982-1983: Vinos de Navarra
 1983-1984: Garsa
 1984-1987: Larios
 1987-1989: Espárragos de Navarra
 1989-1993: Mepamsa
 1993-1994: Proedina
 1994-1995: Ariston
 1995-1997: Lagun Aro
 1997–2009: Cementos Portland
 2009–2010 : Reyno de Navarra
 2010–2012 : AMAYA Sport
 2012–2013: No sponsor

Season by season

20 seasons in Liga ASOBAL

Trophies
Liga ASOBAL
Winners: 2001–02, 2004–05
Runners-Up: 1997–98, 1999-00
Copa del Rey
Winners: 1998–99, 2000–01
Runners-Up: 1997-98
Supercopa ASOBAL
Winners: 2001–02, 2002–03, 2004–05
Runners-Up: 1999-00
Cup-Winners Cup
Winners: 1999–00, 2003–04
European Cup
Winners: 2000-01
Runners-Up: 2002–03, 2005–06
European Supercup
Winners: 2000-01
Runners-Up: 2001-02

Last squad

Stadium Information
Name: - Pabellón Universitario de Navarra
City: - Pamplona
Capacity: - 3,000-3,500
Address: - Campus Arrosadía, s/n.

Notable former players

 Mikhail Yakimovich
 Mateo Garralda
 Iñaki Malumbres
 Jackson Richardson
 Ivano Balić
 Vladimir Hernandez
 Javier Ortigosa
 Davor Dominiković
 Valter Matošević
 Nedeljko Jovanović
 Ratko Nikolić
 Ivan Nikčević
 Vasko Ševaljević
 "Juancho Pérez"
 Oleg Kisselev
 Adrián Crowley
 David Carvajal
 Tomas Svensson
 Danijel Šarić
 Albert Rocas
 Ricardo Andorinho
 David Rašić
 Radivoje Ristanović
 Cristian Malmagro
 Lars T. Jørgensen
 Kasper Hvidt
 Claus Møller Jakobsen
 Kristian Kjelling
 Niko Mindegía
 Carlos Ruesga
 Javier Ortigosa
 Alexandru Buligan
 Ćamil Ferstić
 Danimir Ćurković
 Renato Vugrinec
 Goran Stojanović

References

External links
 Reyno de Navarra San Antonio Official Website
 Revista digital de la Liga Asobal

Spanish handball clubs
Sport in Pamplona
Handball clubs established in 1955
1955 establishments in Spain
Sports teams in Navarre
Defunct handball clubs